Fore may refer to:
Fore people, a highland people of Papua New Guinea
Fore (golf), a warning yelled by golfers
Fore Abbey, an abbey in Ireland
Fore (Parliament of Ireland constituency)
Fore River (Maine), a river
Fore!, the 4th album by Huey Lewis and the News
Fore (EP), an EP by Pegboy
The bow of a ship, the front
 FORE Systems, a computer networking company

A place
Fore, County Westmeath a village beside Fore Abbey
Fore (barony, County Meath), a barony in County Meath
Fore (barony, County Westmeath), a barony in County Westmeath

See also
 Aft